Rockpalast is a live album by British progressive rock band Porcupine Tree, named after the eponymous music festival and TV show, it was recorded at on 19 November 2005 at the Live Music Hall in Cologne, Germany. It was also filmed for a Rockpalast TV special, but not all songs made the broadcast. It is only available to download on the band's official website, and cannot be purchased in stores. The performance relies almost entirely on Deadwing and In Absentia material, with only one older song making the set list. The performances of "Futile" and "Radioactive Toy" were later included as bonus material on the Arriving Somewhere... DVD.

Track listing

Personnel
Steven Wilson – vocals, guitar, remixing
Colin Edwin – bass guitar
Richard Barbieri – synthesizers
Gavin Harrison – drums
John Wesley – backing vocals, guitar
Reiner Kühl – live sound engineer
Erik Nacken – producer
Peter Sommer – executive producer
Lasse Hoile – cover artist
Carl Glover – designer

Porcupine Tree live albums
2006 live albums